North Wootton may refer to:

North Wootton, Dorset
North Wootton, Norfolk
North Wootton, Somerset